Leïla Chellabi is a Moroccan-born French writer and digital artist who has published over 100 books. She is also a former dancer, model, radio host, and songwriter. Chellabi is also notable for being the last companion of the award-winning French novelist Romain Gary.  Her father was an Algerian of Turkish origin who emigrated to Morocco after obtaining French citizenship.

References

External links
Official website

French writers
French digital artists
Women digital artists
French female models
Moroccan models
Moroccan writers
French people of Moroccan descent
French people of Turkish descent
Algerian people of Turkish descent
Moroccan people of Turkish descent
20th-century French women
Living people
Year of birth missing (living people)